Marius Prekevičius (born 22 May 1984 in Gargždai, Klaipėda County) is a Lithuanian former professional basketball. He was a member of the national team at the 2008 Summer Olympics.

Awards and achievements
Baltic Basketball League Presidents Cup winner: 2008
LKL 3rd place winner: 2007, 2008
LKF cup winner: 2009

References

  . Lithuanian Basketball League.

1984 births
Living people
Basketball players at the 2008 Summer Olympics
BC Juventus players
BC Rytas players
KK Włocławek players
Lithuanian men's basketball players
Olympic basketball players of Lithuania
People from Gargždai
Point guards
Shooting guards
BC Lietkabelis coaches